Omar Shakir (born May 16, 1977) is a retired Bermudian football player.

Career

Club
Shakir began his career with PHC Zebras at the age of 7, playing from the youth ranks right through to the senior team, playing every position on the field along the way, besides goalkeeper. After high school, he received an athletic scholarship for soccer to Howard University in Washington D.C.  He was a part of the Mid-Continent Conference championship winning Howard University Bison team in 1998 and runners-up in 1997, picking up several scholar/athlete awards during his four-year playing career. After arriving back to Bermuda in 2000, Shakir had very brief stints at some clubs before eventually returning to his boyhood team PHC Zebras, where he consistently played for many years in the Bermudian Premier Division winning.

He was the third selection of the first round draft pick for the newly formed Island Soccer League in Bermuda before opting instead to join the Bermuda Hogges in the USL Second Division in 2007 captaining the team in the 2008 and 2009 seasons. He then captained PHC Zebras in the 2010–11 season.

International
He made his debut for Bermuda in a January 2008 friendly match against Puerto Rico and earned a total of 8 caps, scoring 1 goal. He has represented his country in 4 FIFA World Cup qualification matches. He played in all four of Bermuda's qualifying games for the 2010 FIFA World Cup, including their 3–1 victory over the Cayman Islands on March 30, 2008, and their historic 2–1 victory over Trinidad and Tobago on June 15, 2008. He was also the captain of the Bermuda National team during their qualifying campaign.

His final international match was a June 2008 World Cup qualification match against Trinidad and Tobago.

International goals
Scores and results list Bermuda's goal tally first.

References

External links

1986 births
Living people
Association football defenders
Bermudian footballers
Bermudian Muslims
Bermuda international footballers
Dandy Town Hornets F.C. players
PHC Zebras players
Bermuda Hogges F.C. players
Howard Bison men's soccer players
USL Second Division players